

Flora

Cnidarians

Research
 Ou et al. (2017) consider early Cambrian species Galeaplumosus abilus and Chengjiangopenna wangii to be junior synonyms of Xianguangia sinica, interpret fossils attributed to members of these species as parts of the same organism and consider X. sinica to be likely stem-cnidarian.
 Pseudooides prima is interpreted as a cnidarian and a senior synonym of Hexaconularia sichuanensis by Duan et al. (2017).
 Fossilized cnidarian medusae are described from the Cambrian Zabriskie Quartzite (California, United States) by Sappenfield, Tarhan & Droser (2017), representing the oldest macrofossil evidence of cnidarian medusae from the Phanerozoic reported so far.
 A study on the morphology of phosphatic tubes of Sphenothallus from the Early Ordovician Fenxiang Formation (China), as well as the Silurian and Early Devonian of Podolia (Ukraine), and its implications for the evolution of symmetry in the body plan of cnidarians is published by Dzik, Baliński & Sun (2017).
 A study on the succession of coral assemblages through the Ordovician–Silurian transition in South China is published by Wang et al. (2017).
 A study on the extant and fossil stony corals, intending to determine whether fossil corals lived in symbiosis with photosynthesizing dinoflagellates, is published by Tornabene et al. (2017).

New taxa

Arthropods

Bryozoans

Research
 Epizoic bryozoans are reported on fossil crabs from the Miocene Mishan Formation (Iran) by Key et al. (2017).

New taxa

Brachiopods

Research
 A study on the selectivity of brachiopod extinctions during the Ordovician–Silurian extinction events is published by Finnegan, Rasmussen & Harper (2017).
 A study on the patterns of biomineralization of Late Permian brachiopod shells and on their implications for inferring the environmental disruptions associated with the Permian–Triassic extinction event is published by Garbelli, Angiolini & Shen (2017).

New taxa

Molluscs

Echinoderms

Research
 Systematic revision of the North American members of the diploporitan family Holocystitidae is published by Sheffield & Sumrall (2017).
 Triassic members of the otherwise Paleozoic groups of sea urchins (the family Proterocidaridae), brittle stars (the family Eospondylidae) and starfish are reported by Thuy, Hagdorn & Gale (2017).
 Phylogenetic analysis and systematic revision of early to middle Paleozoic non-camerate crinoids published by Wright (2017).
 Systematic revision of Ordovician camerate crinoids published by Cole (2017).
 Major revision to the classification of fossil and extant Crinoidea by Wright et al. (2017), including the presentation of new phylogeny-based and rank-based classifications.
 A study on large-scale patterns of morphologic evolution in the Paleozoic radiation of eucladid crinoids is published by Wright (2017).
 A study on the internal morphology of the water vascular system in a specimen of a stem-ophiuroid species Protasterina flexuosa from the Ordovician (Katian) Kope Formation (Kentucky, United States) is published by Clark et al. (2017).
 A study on the paleoecology of the echinoderm species known from the upper Campanian Pierre Shale (including the crinoid Lakotacrinus brezinai), especially on their adaptations to the cold seep environment, is published by Kato, Oji & Shirai (2017).

New taxa

Conodonts

Research
 A study on the conodont assemblage from the Silurian (Homerian) Rootsiküla Formation (Estonia), interpreted as occurring in the evaporite-bearing strata, and on the conodont diversity in various environments, is published by Jarochowska et al. (2017).
 Articulated skeletal remains of Hindeodus parvus, providing direct evidence of the number and arrangement of elements in the apparatus, are described from the Lower Triassic of China by Zhang et al. (2017).

New taxa

Fishes

Amphibians

Research
 A study on the evolution of eye size in early tetrapods and in fish belonging to the lineage that gave rise to tetrapods, as well as on the impact of the eye size on the eye performance while viewing objects through water and through air is published by MacIver et al. (2017).
 A study on the evolution of forelimb musculature from the lobe-finned fish to early tetrapods is published online by Molnar et al. (2017).
 A study on the influence of habitat traits on the persistence length of living and fossil amphibian species is published by Tietje & Rödel (2017).
 A study on the development of the vertebral intercentrum and pleurocentrum in fossil amphibians is published by Danto et al. (2017).
 A study on the probable function of the interpterygoid vacuities (holes in the palate) in temnospondyls as the site of muscle attachment is published by Witzmann & Werneburg (2017).
 A study on the earliest larval development in temnospondyls, as indicated by specimens from the Permian (Sakmarian) lake sediments near Obermoschel (Saar–Nahe Basin, Germany), is published by Werneburg (2017).
 A study on the histology of the small palatal plates and their denticles in a Permian dissorophoid temnospondyl from the Dolese Brothers Limestone Quarry near Richards Spur (Oklahoma, United States) is published by Gee, Haridy & Reisz (2017).
 Taxonomic revision of all described rhinesuchids and a study on the phylogenetic relationships of members of Rhinesuchidae is published by Marsicano et al. (2017), who transfer the species "Rhinesuchus" capensis Haughton (1925) to the genus Rhinesuchoides.
 New specimen of the rhinesuchid Australerpeton cosgriffi (a skull and mandible) is described from the Permian Rio do Rasto Formation (Brazil) by Azevedo, Vega & Soares (2017).
 A description of the anatomy of the braincase and middle ear regions of an exceptionally well-preserved skull of Stanocephalosaurus amenasensis from the Triassic of Algeria is published by Arbez, Dahoumane & Steyer (2017).
 A study on the anatomy of the skulls of metoposaurid species Metoposaurus krasiejowensis and Apachesaurus gregorii, as well as its implications for establishing whether metoposaurids were active or ambush predators is published by Fortuny, Marcé-Nogué & Konietzko-Meier (2017).
 An analysis of the microanatomy and histology of metoposaurid vertebra from the Petrified Forest National Park is published by Gee, Parker & Marsh (2017), who interpret Apachesaurus gregorii as more likely to be an early ontogenetic stage of a large metoposaurid, such as Koskinonodon perfectus rather than a distinct species.
 A juvenile specimen of Koskinonodon perfectus is described from the Norian Petrified Forest Member of the Late Triassic Chinle Formation (Arizona, United States) by Gee & Parker (2017).
 A study on the physiology (especially metabolic rate, body temperature, breathing, feeding, digestion, osmoregulation and excretion) of Archegosaurus decheni is published by Witzmann & Brainerd (2017).
 A study on the histology of the dermal skull roof bones in Kokartus honorarius is published by Skutschas & Boitsova (2017).
 Fossilized soft tissues preserved with the type specimen of the salamander Phosphotriton sigei are described by Tissier, Rage & Laurin (2017).
 A study on the bite force in extant Cranwell's horned frog (Ceratophrys cranwelli) and its implications for estimating the bite force in the Late Cretaceous species Beelzebufo ampinga is published by Lappin et al. (2017).
 Frog fossils, including the first known fossils of shovelnose frogs, are described from the early Pliocene of Kanapoi (Kenya) by Delfino (2017).
 A study on the morphology of the skull of Lethiscus stocki and on the phylogenetic relationships of early tetrapods, recovering lepospondyls as a polyphyletic group, is published by Pardo et al. (2017).

New taxa

Temnospondyls

Lissamphibians

Other amphibians

Reptiles

Synapsids

Non-mammalian synapsids

Research
 Phreatophasma aenigmaticum is argued to be a member of Caseidae by Brocklehurst & Fröbisch (2017).
 New fossil material of the caseid Alierasaurus ronchii is described from the Permian deposits of Cala del Vino Formation (Sardinia, Italy) by Romano et al. (2017).
 A study on the histology of the humeri of Ophiacodon, revealing the existence of fibrolamellar bone in the postcranial bones of this taxon, is published by Shelton & Sander (2017).
 A study on the body size evolution of edaphosaurids and sphenacodontids is published by Brocklehurst & Brink (2017).
 A study on the evolution of the endothermy in non-mammalian therapsids as indicated by oxygen isotope composition of bone and tooth phosphate in Permian and Triassic therapsids is published by Rey et al. (2017).
 A study on the brain morphology of non-mammaliaform therapsids based on skull endocasts of Moschops capensis and a number of biarmosuchians (including Herpetoskylax hopsoni and members of the genera Hipposaurus and Lemurosaurus) is published by Benoit et al. (2017).
 A study on the morphology of the bony labyrinth of five biarmosuchian specimens is published by Benoit et al. (2017).
 A study on the anatomy of the skull of Moschops capensis, revealing adaptations of the central nervous system related to head-to-head fighting, is published by Benoit et al. (2017).
 A study on the resting metabolic rate in Moghreberia nmachouensis is published by Olivier et al. (2017).
 A study on the contents of the depression known as the "unossified zone" in the brain cavity of Diictodon feliceps is published by Laaß, Schillinger & Kaestner (2017).
 A reassessment of the skull morphology and phylogenetic position of Compsodon helmoedi is published by Angielczyk & Kammerer (2017).
 A skeleton of Lystrosaurus curvatus in a fossilized burrow, preserved with taphonomic evidence indicating that this individual was the burrow maker, is described from the Lower Triassic of the South African Karoo Basin by Botha-Brink (2017).
 A structure analogous to the mammalian neocortex is reported in Kawingasaurus fossilis by Laaß & Kaestner (2017).
 A gorgonopsian dentary affected by a condition closely resembling compound odontoma is reported from the Upper Permian of Tanzania by Whitney, Mose & Sidor (2017).
 A detailed description of the braincase of two gorgonopsian specimens (a probable specimen of Aelurosaurus wilmanae from South Africa and a possible specimen of Arctognathus? nasuta from Tanzania) is published by Araújo et al. (2017).
 A redescription and revision of the gorgonopsian genus Arctops is published by Kammerer (2017).
 Rediscovered holotype of the gorgonopsian species Clelandina major is described by Kammerer (2017), who considers this species to be a junior synonym of Clelandina rubidgei.
 A study on the anatomy of the teeth and maxilla of Euchambersia mirabilis and its implications for the hypothesis that venom gland were present in this species is published by Benoit et al. (2017).
 A redescription and a study on the phylogenetic relationships of Silphoictidoides ruhuhuensis is published by Maisch (2017), who considers the species to be a basal member of Baurioidea.
 A study on the internal morphology of the interorbital region of the skull of basal cynodonts, including rarely fossilized orbitosphenoid elements, is published by Benoit et al. (2017).
 A study on the anatomy of the nasal regions of the non-mammalian cynodonts Massetognathus, Probainognathus and Elliotherium, comparing it to the nasal regions of fossil mammaliaforms and extant mammals, is published by Crompton et al. (2017).
 A survey of the aggregations of the specimens of Galesaurus planiceps and Thrinaxodon liorhinus, with emphasis on whether the aggregations consist of individuals of similar age or representing a mixture of different age classes, is published by Jasinoski & Abdala (2017).
 A study on the ontogenetic changes in the skull and mandible of Galesaurus planiceps is published by Jasinoski & Abdala (2017).
 A description of the postcranial skeleton of Boreogomphodon from the Triassic Pekin Formation (North Carolina, United States) and a review of the postcranial variation across members of the family Traversodontidae is published by Liu, Schneider & Olsen (2017).
 A study on the jaw movement of Exaeretodon argentinus as indicated by its dental microwear is published by Kubo, Yamada & Kubo (2017).
 A study on the morphology of the teeth of the cynodont Candelariodon barberenai, as well as on the phylogenetic relationships of the species, is published by Martinelli et al. (2017).
 A description of the anatomy of the postcranial skeleton of Tritylodon longaevus is published by Gaetano, Abdala & Govender (2017).
 A reassessment of the anatomy of the postcanine teeth of Stereognathus, based upon all available material from the United Kingdom, is published by Panciroli et al. (2017), who consider the species S. hebridicus to be a junior synonym of the species S. ooliticus.
 Cast of a burrow which was probably made by a tritheledontid cynodont is described from the Early Jurassic upper Elliot Formation (South Africa) by Bordy et al. (2017).
 A study on the evolution of jaw muscles across the cynodont–mammaliaform transition is published by Lautenschlager et al. (2017).

New taxa

Mammals

Other animals

Research
 A study on a succession of Ediacaran to Cambrian fossil assemblages from the eastern Siberian Platform (Russia) is published by Zhu et al. (2017), who argue that so-called Ediacaran and earliest Cambrian skeletal biotas overlap without notable biotic turnover.
 A study on the Ediacaran taxon Parvancorina minchami, indicating that this animal was capable of performing rheotaxis, is published by Paterson et al. (2017).
 A study on the water flow around the body of the Ediacaran taxon Parvancorina and its implications for the feeding mode and mobility of this animal is published by Darroch et al. (2017).
 Fossils of members of the genus Namacalathus (co-occurring with Cloudina and Corumbella) are reported from the Ediacaran Tagatiya Guazú Formation (Itapucumi Group, Paraguay) by Warren et al. (2017), extending known geographic range of the taxon.
 A study on the morphology, growth and development of Dickinsonia costata is published by Evans, Droser & Gehling (2017).
 A study on the growth and development of Dickinsonia is published by Hoekzema et al. (2017), who interpret this taxon as an animal.
 A study on the anatomy of Dickinsonia costata and D. tenuis is published by Zakrevskaya & Ivantsov (2017), who interpret D. costata as probably descended from D. tenuis by neoteny.
 Description of newly discovered disc-shaped, soft-bodied fossils from the early Cambrian Carrara Formation (California, United States), tentatively assigned to the genus Discophyllum (an animal of uncertain phylogenetic placement, might be a chondrophore or an eldoniid) is published by Lieberman et al. (2017).
 Specimens of Cloudina associated with microbial mat textures are reported from the Ediacaran Tamengo Formation (Brazil) by Becker-Kerber et al. (2017).
 An assemblage of trace fossils from Ediacaran–Cambrian siltstones in Brazil, probably produced by a nematoid-like organism, is described by Parry et al. (2017).
 A diverse fauna dominated by sponges living immediately after the Hirnantian extinction is described from China by Botting et al. (2017).
 A diverse Early Triassic (Olenekian) marine fauna, including leptomitid protomonaxonid sponges (a group otherwise known only from Cambrian and Ordovician), new forms of the crinoid order Holocrinida displaying advanced characters, a probable basal ophiodermatid and gladius-bearing coleoids (previously unknown in Early Triassic strata) is reported from Paris (Idaho, United States) by Brayard et al. (2017).
 A study on the muscle anatomy of Pambdelurion whittingtoni is published by Young & Vinther (2017).
 Cambrian species Zhenghecaris shankouensis, originally classified as a bivalved arthropod, is reinterpreted as a member of Radiodonta by Zeng et al. (2017).
 The holotype specimen of a putative lobopodian species Aysheaia prolata is reinterpreted as an isolated frontal appendage of a radiodontan belonging to the genus Stanleycaris by Pates, Daley & Ortega-Hernández (2017).
 A revision of the radiodontan genus Caryosyntrips is published by Pates & Daley (2017), who interpret the holotype specimen of a putative lobopodian species Mureropodia apae as a partial isolated appendage of a member of the genus Caryosyntrips.
 Description of the morphology of Amplectobelua symbrachiata, with a focus on its head region, is published by Cong et al. (2017).
 A study on the anatomy of the Cambrian hyolith Haplophrentis, as well as on the phylogenetic relationships of the hyoliths, is published by Moysiuk, Smith & Caron (2017).
 A study on the phylogenetic relationships of Tullimonstrum gregarium, challenging its interpretation as a vertebrate, is published by Sallan et al. (2017).
 New exceptionally preserved fossils of Vetulicola longbaoshanensis are described from the Lower Cambrian Wulongqing Formation (China) by Li, Liu & Ou (2017).
 Putative trematode metacercariae preserved at the base of the femora of an agamid lizard are described from the Cretaceous Burmese amber (Myanmar) by Poinar et al. (2017).

New taxa

Other organisms

Research
 Eoarchean (over 3,700 million years old) organic residues are reported from Isua, West Greenland by Hassenkam et al. (2017).
 Putative fossilized microorganisms that are at least 3,770 million and possibly 4,280 million years old are described from the Nuvvuagittuq belt (Quebec, Canada) by Dodd et al. (2017).
 Organic carbon contents are reported from the oldest metasedimentary rocks from northern Labrador (Canada) by Tashiro et al. (2017), who interpret the finding as the oldest evidence of organisms greater than 3.95 Ga; the study is subsequently criticized by Whitehouse et al. (2019).
 Potential biosignatures, including stromatolites, are reported from the newly discovered rocks recovered from ca. 3.48 billion years old Dresser Formation (Pilbara Craton, Australia) by Djokic et al. (2017).
 Lenticular structures known from the ~3.4 Ga Kromberg Formation (Kaapvaal Craton, South Africa) are interpreted as organic Archean microfossils by Oehler et al. (2017).
 Fossils of early eukaryotes Tappania plana, Dictyosphaera macroreticulata and Valeria lophostriata are described from the early Mesoproterozoic Greyson Formation (Belt Supergroup, Montana, United States) by Adam et al. (2017).
 2.4-billion-year-old filamentous fossils forming mycelium-like structures, considered to be either the oldest known fungi or members of an unknown branch of fungus-like mycelial organisms, are described from the Ongeluk Formation (South Africa) by Bengtson et al. (2017).
 A study on the anatomy of the fossils of Chuaria circularis recovered from the Tonian Liulaobei Formation (China) is published by Tang et al. (2017), who interpret Chuaria as most likely a simple multicellular organism (a colonial organism without cell differentiation).
 A study on the apatitic scale microfossils from the Fifteenmile Group (Yukon, Canada), indicating that the fossils document the existence of eukaryotic biomineralizing organisms approximately 810 million years ago, is published by Cohen et al. (2017).
 A study on the structure, morphology, and development of the large intracellular structures preserved in embryo-like microfossils from the Ediacaran Weng'an Biota (China) is published by Yin et al. (2017), who interpret these structures as likely cell nuclei.
 A study testing the suggested link between the appearance of large body size in rangeomorphs (organisms of uncertain phylogenetic placement, likely animals) in the Ediacaran and postulated regional increases in environmental nutrient levels is published by Hoyal Cuthill & Conway Morris (2017).
 A study on the internal morphology of Rangea from the Nama Group (Namibia), based on data obtained using X-ray micro-computed tomography, is published by Sharp et al. (2017).
 Smith et al. (2017) report the discovery of fossils of Gaojiashania from the Ediacaran strata of the Nama Group (Namibia) and a new fossil assemblage from the Ediacaran strata of the Wood Canyon Formation (Nevada, United States), including erniettomorphs and a variety of tubular body fossils.
 A study on the well-preserved Devonian calcareous nanicellid foraminiferans from the Świętokrzyskie Mountains (Poland) and their implications for the biomineralization style and affinities of Paleozoic fusulinid foraminiferans is published by Dubicka & Gorzelak (2017).
 Four forms of modern-looking gilled mushrooms, including two taxa belonging to the family Marasmiaceae, are described from the Cretaceous Burmese amber by Cai et al. (2017).

New taxa

General paleontology
Research related to paleontology that either does not concern any of the groups of the organisms listed above, or concerns multiple groups.

 A study on the links between changes in the composition of exposed continental crust and oxygenation of the atmosphere in the Precambrian is published by Smit & Mezger (2017).
 A review of the progress in modeling the Snowball Earth atmosphere, cryosphere, hydrosphere and lithosphere, specifically as it pertains to Cryogenian geology and geobiology, is published by Hoffman et al. (2017).
 A revised record of fossil eukaryotic steroids during the Neoproterozoic is presented by Brocks et al. (2017), who argue that bacteria were the only notable primary producers in the oceans before the Cryogenian, and that rapid rise of marine planktonic algae to domination occurred in the narrow time interval between the Sturtian and Marinoan glaciations, 659–645 million years ago, likely driving the subsequent radiation of animals in the Ediacaran period.
 A study evaluating whether mass extinction events over the last 500 million year were caused by astronomical phenomena is published by Erlykin et al. (2017).
 A study on the water column geochemistry of the Yangtze Sea during the Ediacaran-Cambrian transition and its implications for the relationship between ocean oxygenation and Early Cambrian animal diversification is published by Zhang et al. (2017).
 A study on the links between the expansion of siliceous sponges and seawater oxygenation during the Ediacaran–Cambrian transition is published by Tatzel et al. (2017).
 A study on the factors influencing marine invertebrate diversity dynamics through the Phanerozoic is published by Cermeño et al. (2017).
 Edwards et al. (2017) identify a strong temporal link between the rising atmospheric oxygen levels and the Great Ordovician Biodiversification Event.
 A study on the impact of the drawdown of atmospheric carbon dioxide (caused by burial of organic carbon leading to the formation of coal) on the climate around the Carboniferous/Permian boundary is published by Feulner (2017).
 A comprehensive reconstruction of the Permian (Lopingian) Bletterbach Biota (Italy) and a review of other best-known Lopingian terrestrial associations containing both vertebrate and plant remains is published by Bernardi et al. (2017).
 A study on the causal connection between the Siberian Traps large igneous province magmatism and Permian–Triassic extinction event, identifying the initial emplacement pulse as likely to have triggered mass extinction, is published by Burgess, Muirhead & Bowring (2017).
 Viglietti, Rubidge & Smith (2017) review the tectonic setting of the Late Permian Karoo Basin (South Africa), provide an updated basin development model, and interpret their findings as indicating that the climatic changes associated with the Permian–Triassic extinction event were occurring much lower in the stratigraphy (and thus earlier) than previously documented.
 A summary of knowledge of the impact of Permian-Triassic mass extinction on reef ecosystems, and on their recovery after this extinction, is presented by Martindale, Foster & Velledits (2017).
 A study on benthic invertebrate communities from the Lower Triassic Werfen Formation (Italy), aiming to test whether carbon isotope perturbations during the Early Triassic were associated with biotic crises that impeded benthic recovery after the Permian–Triassic extinction event, is published by Foster et al. (2017).
 A study on the impact of the magmatic activity associated with the Central Atlantic magmatic province on the Triassic–Jurassic extinction event is published by Davies et al. (2017).
 A study on the volcanic activity at the end of the Triassic as indicated by mercury concentrations in sediments from around the world is published by Percival et al. (2017).
 A study on the oxygen levels in Earth's oceans during and after the Triassic–Jurassic extinction event as indicated by uranium isotopes in shallow-marine limestones in the Lombardy Basin (northern Italy) is published by Jost et al. (2017).
 A high-resolution stratigraphic chart for terrestrial Late Cretaceous units of North America and a study on the stratigraphic ranges of North American dinosaurs is published by Fowler (2017).
 A study on the impact that large amounts of soot injected into the atmosphere during the Cretaceous–Paleogene extinction event (probably caused by global wildfires) had on the climate is published by Bardeen et al. (2017).
 A study estimating the decrease of the air temperature and the duration of the climate cooling caused by Chicxulub impact at the end of the Cretaceous is published by Brugger, Feulner & Petri (2017).
 A study on the volume of the climate-active gases released from sedimentary rocks as a result of the Chicxulub impact, as well as on their effect on the global climate, is published by Artemieva, Morgan & Expedition 364 Science Party (2017).
 Kaiho & Oshima (2017) calculate the amounts of stratospheric soot and sulfate formed by a virtual asteroid impact at various global locations, and conclude that the Cretaceous–Paleogene extinction event was caused by the Chicxulub impact happening at the hydrocarbon-rich, sulfate-dominated area on the Earth's surface, and that an impact at a low–medium hydrocarbon area on Earth would be unlikely to cause mass extinction.
 A study on the data sets of molluscan fossils from the Cretaceous–Paleogene of the Seymour Island (Antarctica) is published by Tobin (2017), who identifies possible evidence of two separate extinction events, one prior to the Cretaceous–Paleogene boundary, and one simultaneous with the bolide impact at the Cretaceous–Paleogene boundary.
 A study on the behavioral and ecological diversification of animals that colonized land as indicated by trace fossils is published by Minter et al. (2017).
 A study on the age of the Cowie Harbour Fish Bed (Scotland, United Kingdom), containing fish and arthropod fossils (including the millipede Pneumodesmus newmani), is published by Suarez et al. (2017).
 A study on the preservation of skin and keratinous integumentary structures in tetrapod fossils through time is published by Eliason et al. (2017).
 A study on the differences between the tetrapod faunas at different latitudes during the early and middle Permian, as well as their implications for establishing whether the Olson's Extinction was a genuine event, is published by Brocklehurst et al. (2017).
 A study on the non-flying terrestrial tetrapod species richness through the Mesozoic and early Palaeogene is published by Close et al. (2017).
 A study on the evolution of the shape of brain and skull roof during the transition from early reptiles through archosauromorphs, including nonavian dinosaurs, to birds is published by Fabbri et al. (2017).
 A study on the structure and vulnerability of the food web in marine vertebrate assemblages prior to the Cretaceous–Paleogene extinction event as indicated by calcium isotope data from plesiosaurs and mosasaurs is published by Martin et al. (2017).
 Qvarnström et al. (2017) reconstruct fossil inclusions in two coprolites (produced by an insectivorous animal and a large aquatic predator) from the Late Triassic locality of Krasiejów (Poland) using propagation phase-contrast synchrotron microtomography.
 A study on the fossil inclusions in coprolite fragments (produced by medium to large-sized carnivores, possibly therocephalian therapsids or early archosauriforms) recovered from the Late Permian locality of Vyazniki (Russia) is published by Bajdek et al. (2017).
 A new tetrapod assemblage from the lowermost levels of the Triassic Chañares Formation (Argentina), dominated by fossils of Tarjadia ruthae, dicynodonts and cynodonts, and also including fossils of other pseudosuchians and rhynchosaurs, is described by Ezcurra et al. (2017), who also reinterpret Tarjadia ruthae and Archeopelta arborensis as erpetosuchid archosaurs.
 A study on the cosmopolitanism of terrestrial amniote faunas in the aftermath of the Permian–Triassic extinction event and Triassic–Jurassic extinction event is published by Button et al. (2017).
 Frese et al. (2017) determine the mineral and elemental composition of a range of fossils from the Talbragar fossil site (Australia) and their rock matrices using ultraviolet light-induced fluorescence/photoluminescence, X-ray fluorescence and X-ray diffractometry, and use those techniques to reveal anatomical details of animals and plants fossils that weren't discernible otherwise.
 A study on changes of the size of fossil marine shells and predatory drill holes in those shells during the Phanerozoic, as well as their implications for changes of predator-prey size ratio throughout the Phanerozoic, is published by Klompmaker et al. (2017).
 A study evaluating the utility of oxygen-isotope compositions of fossilised foraminifera tests as proxies for surface- and deep-ocean paleotemperatures, and its implications for inferring Late Cretaceous and Paleogene deep-ocean and high-latitude surface-ocean temperatures, is published by Bernard et al. (2017).
 A study on the glacial development and environmental changes in the Aurora Subglacial Basin (Antarctica) throughout the Cenozoic based on geophysical and geological evidence is published by Gulick et al. (2017).
 A study on the onset duration of the Paleocene–Eocene Thermal Maximum is published by Kirtland Turner et al. (2017).
 A study on the relationship between volcanic activity in the North Atlantic Igneous Province and the Paleocene–Eocene Thermal Maximum is published by Gutjahr et al. (2017).
 A study on the environment in the area corresponding to the present-day Amazon basin in the Miocene as indicated by data from the shark and ray fossils from the Pirabas Formation (Brazil) is published by Aguilera et al. (2017).
 A study on the impact of the Messinian salinity crisis on Mediterranean magmatism is published by Sternai et al. (2017).
 A study on the changes of ice sheets volume and sea level during the late Pliocene is published by de Boer et al. (2017).
 Pimiento et al. (2017) identify a previously unrecognized extinction event among marine megafauna at the end of the Pliocene.
 A study on the aridity in eastern Africa over the past 4.4 million years as indicated by oxygen isotope ratios in fossil herbivore tooth enamel, and on its implications for inferring the role of climate in shaping early hominin environments, is published by Blumenthal et al. (2017).
 Tierney, deMenocal & Zander (2017) reconstruct temperature and aridity in the Horn of Africa region spanning the past 200,000 years.
 A vertebrate fauna from the Pleistocene and Holocene of Sumba (Indonesia) is described by Turvey et al. (2017).
 A study on the modified mammalian bones from the Plio–Pleistocene of Ethiopia is published by Sahle, El Zaatari & White (2017), who interpret the marks on some of these bones as more likely to be produced by crocodiles than by hominids using stone tools.
 Hagstrum et al. (2017) report impact-related microspherules and elevated platinum concentrations found in fine-grained sediments retained within Late Pleistocene bison and mammoth skull fragments from Alaska and Yukon, and interpret the findings as evidence of repeated airbursts and ground/ice impacts associated with multiple episodes of cosmic impact.
 A study on changes in landscape moisture in the rangelands in Europe, Siberia and the Americas during the late Pleistocene as indicated by data from the bones of megaherbivores is published by Rabanus-Wallace et al. (2017).

References

 
2010s in paleontology
2017 in science